Suhas Madhukar Khamkar (born 9 August 1980) is a professional bodybuilder from India.

Early life 
Khamkar is a native of Kolhapur region and comes from a family of fitness experts and bodybuilders. His inspiration for bodybuilding traces back to his hometown Kolhapur, where he grew up watching wrestlers and bodybuilders
. At age 16 Khamkar drew inspiration from Arnold Schwarzenegger and sought to become a world champion bodybuilder.

Career 
Khamkar is the first Indian bodybuilder to win  his pro card after winning the Mr. Amateur Olympia contest in October 2018.

In the 2012 Mr. India event, Khamkar placed 1st in the 80 kg category.

Khamkar was an employee of Central Railway of India. He was the first Indian bodybuilder to win a national level gold medal in the Railway national competitions. In 2010, Khamkar became the first Indian bodybuilder to win the Mr. Asia contest. He placed second in the 2012 amateur Mr. Olympia held in Kuwait and placed second in the 2017 Amateur Asia Mr. Olympia contest.

Achievements 
 Shivpremi Rajya Gaurav Puraskar 2019.
 First Indian Bodybuilder to achieve PRO CARD.
 Mr. Amateur Olympia (2018)-Champion of Champion.
 Mr. Asia Body Building Title (2010).
 Mr. Olympia Amateur Body Building 1st Runner-up (2012).
 Mr. World Bodybuilding 1st Runner-up (2010–11).
 Ten-Time Mr. India Body Building Title (2004, 2006 To 2015).
 eight Times Mr.Maharashtra Title (2006 To 2008 & 2010 To 2014).
 Nine-Time Mr. All India Railway Gold (2004 To 2012).
 Four-Time Mr.Shivsena Body Building Title (2006, 2008 To 2010).
 Four-Time Mr.Mumbai Mayor Body Building Title (2002, 2003, 2007, 2008).
 Four-Time Mr.New Mumbai Mayor Body Building Title (2003, 2007, 2009, 2010).
 Five-Time Mr. Hindu Hruday Samarat Body Building Title (2005, 2008 To 2011).
 Mr. Goa Body Building Title (2006).
 Two-Times Mr.Mayor Kolhapur Body Building Title (2001, 2005).
 Mr. Mayor Ujjain (M.P.) Bodybuilding Title (2010).
 Three-Time Mr.Maharashtra Kamgar Body Building Title (1997 To 1999).
 Navi Mumbai mahapaur shree—participate (1996)
 pune festival shree—participate 1996
 Rajarampuri gym maryadit—1996 (Third rank) 
 Junior Maharashtra shree pune—1996 (Third rank)
 Thane mahapaur shree—1996 participate
 Tarun Bharat shree—1996 participate.
 Youth Development club pattankodoli shree—1997 (Third rank)
 Shahu mohotsav shree—1997 (First rank)
 Maharashtra kamgar shree—1997 ( second rank) 
 Desai health club raybag shree—1997 ( Third rank) 
 Maratha shree—1997 (Third rank) 
 Pattankadoli shree—1997 (Third rank) 
 Vadange shree—1997( third rank) 
 Nashik mahapaur shree—1997 participate
 Sangali mahapaur Shree—1997( fourth rank) 
 Yuvakansha Mitra manual shree—1998 (Third  rank) 
 Sankeshvar shree—1998 (second rank) 
 Colleage shree—1998 (Champion of Champions)
 Walawalkar shree—1998 (Champion)
 Vadange shree—1998 (Third rank) 
 Maharashtra kamgar shree—1998 (Champion of Champions)
 Padli Khurda shree—1998 (second) 
 Nanded mahapaur shree—1998 fourth 
 Ashta Shree—1998 Champion 
 Raybag shree—1998 second 
 Kolhapur shree—1998 Champions of Champion 
 Pacchim new Bharat shree—1998 second 
 Yuvakansha Shree—1998 Champion 
 Sangrul shree—1998 Third 
 Maratha yuvak sanga shree—1998 Third
 Jr. Maharashtra shree—1998 Fourth 
 International trial federation competition—1998 fifth 
 Mumbai mahapaur shree—1998 participate
 Kumar ghat mahapaur shree—1998 third 
 Shahu shree—1999 second 
 Kamgar shree—1999 Champions of Champion 
 Raybag shree—1999 Champion 
 Maharashtra kamgar shree—1999 Second 
 BPS Swatentradin shree—1999 Champions of champion 
 Sangli mahapaur shree—1999 Champions of champion 
 Thane mahapaur shree—1999 participate
 Patankar katha shree—1999  Champion 
 Liberty shree—1999 third 
 Valvalkar shree—1999 Champion 
 Vasagde shree—1999 Champion 
 Marathe yuvak sangh shree—1999 Third 
 Ashta Shree—1999 Champion 
 KD mangave Shree—1999 Champion 
 Fighters Shree—1999 Champion 
 Patan shree—1999 Champion 
 Yuvakansha Shree—1999 Champion 
 Shiv goda patil vikramnagar shree—1999 Champion 
 Vaida patil shree—1999  Champion 
 Kolhapur shree—1999 champion of champion 
 Jr. Maharashtra shree—1999 Third 
 Shinav kokan—1999 Champion 
 Tarun Bharat shree—1999 Sixth 
 Shankarrav shinde shree—1999 Champion 
 Shinde sanskrutik mandal shree—1999 Champion 
 Ekta shree—1999 Champion 
 Pharli Shree—2000 second 
 Sharad Powar shree—2000 Second 
 Mr. Kolhapur—2000 Champions of champion 
 College shree—2000 Champions of champion 
 Utreshvar shree—2000 Champion 
 Malkapur shree—2000 Champions of champion 
 New Mumbai mahapaur shree—2000fourth 
 Tarun Bharat shree—2000 fifth 
 Shahu shree—2000 second 
 Vishvashanti shree—2000 Champions of champion 
 Valvalkar shree—2000 Champions of champion 
 Dharmavir raje Sambhaji Shree—2000 Champions of champion 
 Rotari shree—2000 Champions of champion 
 Uttur shree—2000 second 
 Kundal shree—2000 second 
 Jamadar shree—2000 Champion 
 Vikramnagar shree—2000 Champion
 Jr.maharashtra shree—2000 Second 
 Practice shree—2000 Champion 
 Vai Shree—2000 Champion 
 Gokul shirgav shree—2000 Champion 
 Jr. Maharashtra shree—2000 Second 
 BPS sports shree—2000 Champions of champion 
 SP group shree—2000 Champions of champion 
 Subhrav gavli talim—2000 Champion 
 Sangrul shree—2000 Champion 
 Phonda ghat—2000 Champion 
 Sangram siha Mohite patil shree—2001 Champion 
 Shahu shree—2001 Champions of champion 
 Man of body plus—2001 Champions of champion 
 Kundal shree—2001 Champions of champion
 Major R.G patil shree—2001 Champions of champion 
 Vijay siha shree—2001 Champions of champion 
 Navratna shree shirgav—2001 Champions of champion 
 Malkapur shree—2001 Champions of champion 
 Bajirav appa shree—2001 Champions of champion 
 Bheem shree—2001 Champions of champion 
 Valavalkar shree—2001 Champions of champion 
 Shahid Abhijeet shree—2001 Champions of champion 
 Vijay Shree—2001 Champions of champion 
 Shahu sugar shree—2001          Champions of champion 
 Vivek shree—2001 Champions of champion 
 Nangivali shree—2001 Champions of champion 
 Kasbe Digraj shree—2001  champion 
 SP group—2001 Champions of champion 
 Bhosale vadi shree—2001 Champions of champion 
 Hercules Gymnashiam—2001 Champions of champion 
 Pattan kadoli—2001 Champions of champion 
 Shahu shree BPS Kolhapur—2001 Champions of champion 
 Pacchim Maharashtra shree—2001 champion 
 Mahapaur shree—2001 Champion 
 Bal Mitra shree—2001 Champions of champion 
 Ranjeet shree—2001 Champions of champion 
 College shree  Shivaji vidyapitha—2001 Champions of champion 
 Narayan rane shree—2001 Champions of champion 
 Tarun Bharat shree—2001 fifth
 Kadgav shree—2001 Champions of champion 
 All India interunivercity—2001 third 
 Bhagva Rakshakakshi—2001 Champions of champion 
 Jr. Maharashtra shree—2001 second 
 Pattan kadoli shree—2001 Champions of champion 
 Karad arban bank shree—2001 Champion 
 Malkapur shree—2001 Champions of champion 
 Fighter sports shree—2001 Champions of champion 
 Tatysaheb kaur  varna—2001 Champion 
 Swastika shree—2001 Champions of champion 
 Hercules Gymnashiam—2001 Champions of champion 
 KD mangave Shree—2001 Champions of champion 
 Vaigade Shree—2001 Champions of champion 
 Utkarsh shree—2001 Champions of champion 
 Vadgav shree—2001 Champions of champion 
 Gokul shirgav shree—2001 champion
 Lokmanya shree—2002 Champions of champion 
 Ishwar sports chashak—2002 Champions of champion 
 Shree Bal hanuman shree—2002 Champions of champion 
 Vyayam mandal shree—2002 Champions of champion 
 College shree—2002 Champions of champion 
 Hercules Gymnashiam—2002 Champions of champion 
 Karad arban bank—2002 Champions of champion 
 Shiv shree—2002 Champions of champion 
 Vengurle Hercules—2002 Champions of champion 
 Gajgeshvar shree—2002 Champions of champion 
 Tarun Bharat shree—2002 Third 
 Bhosale vadi shree—2002 Champions of champion 
 Paltan festival—2002 champion 
 Golden shree—2002 Champions of champion 
 Malkapur shree—2002 Champions of champion 
 Hutatma shree—2002 Champions of champion 
 Mumbai mahapaur shree—2002 Champion 
 Anil gujar shree—2002 Champions of champion 
 Fedretion cup rashtriya—2002 Champions of champion 
 All India university—2002 second 
 Narayan rane shree—2002 Champions of champion 
 Abhijeet shree—2002 Champions of champion 
 Shahu shree—2002 Champions of champion 
 Golden shree—2002 Champions of champion 
 Karambali shree—2002 Champions of champion 
 Rashtriya hawraha west Bangal—2002 Best of ten 
 Open Congress shree—2002 Champions of champion 
 Shrimanta Valavalkar shree—2002 Champions of champion 
 Bal Mitra shree—2002 Champions of champion 
 Lokmanya shree—2002 Champions of champion 
 Tarun Bharat shree—2003 Champions of champion 
 Shahu sakhar shree—2003 Champions of champion 
 Shiv Samarth shree—2003 Champions of champion 
 Golden shree—2003 Champions of champion 
 Phonda ghat shree—2003 Champions of champion 
 Prashant shree—2003 Champions of champion 
 Bajirav appa shree—2003 Champions of champion 
 Varna shree—2003 Champions of champion 
 Lokmanya shree—2003 Champions of champion 
 College shree—2003 Champions of champion 
 Pachgav shree—2003 Champions of champion 
 New Mumbai mahapaur shree—2003 Champions of champion
 Shree shivshankar shree—2003 Champions of champion
 Hutatma jotiram Chavgule—2003 Champions of champion
 Karambali shree—2003 Champions of champion
 Kai ani gujar shree—2003 Champions of champion
 Bal Bharat krida mandal icchalkaranji shree—2003 Champions of champion
 Fedretion shree—2003 Champions of champion
 Mumbai mahapaur shree—2003 Champions of champion
 Icchalkaranji shree—2003 Champions of champion
 Hatkalangle shree—2004 Champions of champion 
 Kolhapur Hercules shree—2004 Champions of champion 
 Kundal shree—2004 Champions of champion 
 Zee Shree—2004 Champions of champion 
 Atal shree—2004 Champions of champion 
 Maharashtra shree—2004 second 
 Raje Sambhaji Shree—2004 Champions of champion 
 Sharad shree—2004 Champions of champion 
 Babdev shree—2004 Champions of champion 
 Mi kolhapur Hercules—2004 Champions of champion 
 Pantha Valvalkar shree—2004 Champions of champion 
 Sangram shree—2004 Champions of champion 
 Sadguru shree—2004 Champions of champion 
 Hindu hruday  samratha—2005 Champions of champion 
 Pacchim Maharashtra shree—2005 Champions of champion 
 Tarun Bharat shree—2005 Champions of champion 
 Sangharsh shree—2005 Champions of champion 
 Charlies sports club—2005 Champions of champion 
 Vile Parle shree—2005 Champions of champion 
 Railway interdivision—2005 Champions of champion 
 Parag shree—2005 Champions of champion 
 All India Railway—2005 Champions of champion 
 Om samartha Bharat shree—2005 Champions of champion 
 Raje Maharashtra shree—2005 Champions of champion 
 Hiral shree—2005 Champions of champion 
 Ganesh shree—2005 Champions of champion 
 Nagar vikas Shree—2005 Champions of champion 
 Narayan rane shree—2005 Champions of champion 
 Vasai shree—2005 Champions of champion 
 Sada hasan shree—2005 Champions of champion 
 North India champion—2005 Champions of champion 
 Jay ambe shree—2005 Champions of champion 
 Sadguru shree—2005 Champions of champion 
 Khermode shree—2005 Champions of champion 
 Jr. Maharashtra shree—2005 Champions of champion 
 Sharad shree—2005 Champions of champion 
 Atal shree—2005 Champions of champion 
 Vile Parle shree—2005 Champions of champion 
 Amravati mahapaur shree—2005 Champions of champion 
 Maharashtra shree—2006 Champion 
 Master Goa—2006  Champions of champion 
 Pacchim Maharashtra shree—2006  Champions of champion 
 Shivsena shree—2006  Champions of champion 
 Tarun Bharat shree—2006  Champions of champion 
 Yashvant shree—2006  Champions of champion 
 Parag shree—2006  Champions of champion 
 Kolhapur mahapaur shree—2006  Champions of champion 
 Sangrul shree—2006  Champions of champion 
 All India Railway—2006 Second 
 Manodhirya shree—2006  Champions of champion 
 Bharat shree—2006 Third 
 Balvan shree—2006  Champions of champion 
 Shivneri shree—2006  Champions of champion 
 Chunna bhatti shree—2006  Champions of champion 
 Narayan shree—2006  Champions of champion 
 Shivsena shree—2006  Champions of champion 
 Mora Bhai dar mahapaur shree—2006  Champions of champion 
 Rashtra vadi shree—2006  Champions of champion 
 Shivsena shree—2006  Champions of champion 
 Eksargav Devi shree—2006  Champions of champion 
 Om samarth Bharat shree—2007 Champions of champion 
 Hruday Samarth shree—2007 Champions of champion 
 Poisir gym shree—2007 Champions of champion 
 Rukadi shree—2007 Champions of champion 
 Satam shree—2007 Champions of champion 
 Mumbai shree—2007 Champions of champion 
 Indian Railway—2007 Champions of champion 
 Ma. Prakash awde shree—2007 Champions of champion 
 Bharat shree—2007 Champions of champion 
 Bharat shree—2007 second 
 Pacchim Maharashtra shree—2007 Champions of champion 
 Lahuji shree—2007 Champions of champion 
 Navi Mumbai mahapaur shree—2007 Champions of champion 
 Rashtravadi shree—2007 Champions of champion
 Amdar shree—2007 Champions of champion 
 Rashtravadi shree—2007 Champions of champion 
 Saheb shree—2007 Champions of champion 
 Parle mohotsav shree—2007 Champions of champion 
 Parle mohstav shree—2007 Champions of champion 
 Rajypoisar gym shree—2008 Champions of champion 
 Rajya Shivsena shree -2008 Champions of champion
 Rajya mavla shree-2008 Champions of champion  
 Rajya hinduhruday samrat shree-2008 Champions of champion 
 Ekta shree -2008 Champions of champion 
 Gurudatt shree-2008 Champions of champion 
 Rastrwadi shree -2008 Champions of champion 
 Pimpleshwar  mhadev hanuman shree-2008 Champions of champion 
 Kalyan dombiwali mahapour shree-2008 Champions of champion 
 Sudarshan shree-2008 Champions of champion 
 Aamdar chashak-2008 Champions of champion 
 All India Railway -2008 Champions of champion 
 Mumbai mahapaur shree-2008 Champions of champion 
 Parag shree -2008 Champions of champion 
 Aarogyadham shree-2008 Champions of champion 
 Aambedkar shree-2008 Champions of champion 
 Shahu sakhar shree-2008 Champions of champion 
 All India Railway -2008 Champions of champion 
 Karya Samarath harishchandar kakde shree-2008 Champions of champion 
 Aamdar shree-2008 Champions of champion 
 Narayan koregav shree-2009 Champions of champion 
 Gajanan shree-2009 Champions of champion 
 Navi Mumbai mahapaur shree -2009 Champions of champion 
 Shivsena mharasta shree-2009 Champions of champion 
 Hindu hruday Samrath shree-2009 Champions of champion 
 Kadiwali shree-2009 Champions of champion 
 Chembur shree-2009 Champions of champion 
 Mr. Stentat shree-2009 Champions of champion 
 Parag shree-2009 Champions of champion  
 Bhagva shree-2009 Champions of champion 
 Parag shree-2009 Champions of champion 
 Rastrawadi shree-2009 Champions of champion 
 Parag shree-2009 Champions of champion 
 Parle -2009 Champions of champion 
 Shivsena shree-2009 Champions of champion 
 Parag shree -2009 Champions of champion 
 Swarajya shree-2010 Champions of champion  
 Aamdar shree-2010 Champions of champion 
 Navi Mumbai mahapaur shree -2010Champions of champion 
 Raj shree-2010 Champions of champion 
 Shivsena shree -2010 Champions of champion 
 Manse shree -2010 Champions of champion 
 Anna patil shree-2010 Champions of champion 
 Superim shree-2010 Champions of champion 
 Shivsena shree-2010 Champions of champion
 Suprim shree-2010 Champions of champion 
 Kandiwali shree-2010 Champions of champion 
 Ambarnath navnirman shree-2010 Champions of champion 
 Marathi Hruday Samarath shree-2010 Champions of champion 
 jayant shree-2010 Champions of champion 
 Manse boriwali shree -2010 Champions of champion
 Dharmveer shree-2010 Champions of champion
 Lokadhikar shree-2010 Champions of champion
 Kalyan dombiwali mahapaur shree -2010 Champions of champion
 Sachin Aahari shree-2010 Champions of champion
 Nagar Sevak shree-2010 Champions of champion
 Parag shree-2010 Champions of champion
 Shangri-la shree-2010 Champions of champion
 Bheem shree-2010 Champions of champion
 Shanta Cruz shree-2010 Champions of champion
 Aamdar shree-2010 Champions of champion
 Koregavkar shree-2010 Champions of champion
 Shivsai shree-2010 Champions of champion
 Satish sugar classic -2010 Champions of champion
 Mhapour shree-2010 Champions of champion
 Sainath shree-2010 Champions of champion 
 Samrath Mahadik shree-2010 Champions of champion
 Dahisar shree-2011 Champions of champion
 Hinduhruday samratha shree-2011 Champions of champion
 Suprimo shree-2011 Champions of champion
 Badlapur shree-2011 Champions of champion
 Hinduhruday samratha shree-2011 Champions of champion
 Nagar Sevak shree-2011 Champions of champion
 Aamdar shree-2011 Champions of champion
 Hardcore shree-2011 Champions of champion
 Santakruz shree-2011 Champions of champion
 solapur shree-2011 Champions of champion
 Vashi mahapour shree-2011 Champions of champion
 Guru Datta shree-2011 Champions of champion

References

12.https://www.pudhari.news/news/Kolhapur/Flashback-2017-Kolhapur-Youth-Mileston-Achivment-in-this-Year-Read-It-Before-Good-Bye-2017-and-Welcome-New-Year-2018/m/

13. http://epaper.tarunbharat.com/m5/1618813/Aksharyatra/AKSHARYATRA#page/8/1

14. http://www.lokmat.com/other-sports/suhas-khamkars-1st-indian-bodybuilder-won-ifbb-pro-card/

15. http://www.livemarathi.in/?p=43150    
Shivpremi Rajya Gaurav Puraskar 2019.

16.http://epaper.saamana.com/imageview_24582_1530379_4_71.html

17.http://epaper.mymahanagar.com/fullview.php?artid=AAPLAMAHAN_MUM_20190704_4_5

18.http://epaper.freepressjournal.in/m5/2226547/Navshakti/04-Jul-2019#page/2/1

19.http://product.sakaalmedia.com/portal/SM.aspx?ID=140105

20.http://epaper.patrika.com/m5/2228450/Mumbai/Mumbai#page/2/1

21. https://www.lokmat.com/other-sports/newcomers-can-get-government-assistance-if-bodybuilding-qualifies-olympics-say-suhas-khamkar-a681/

External links 
 Official Website
 Suhas Khamkar on IndianBodybuilding
 Suhas Khamkar at various events of Indian Body Building and Fitness Federation

Indian bodybuilders
1985 births
Living people